The John Burroughs Medal, named for nature writer John Burroughs (1837–1921), is awarded each year in April by the John Burroughs Association to the author of a book that the association has judged to be distinguished in the field of natural history. Only twice has the award been given to a work of fiction.

List of recipients of the John Burroughs Medal

1926 - William Beebe, Pheasants of the World
1927 - Ernest Thompson Seton, Lives of Game Animals
1928 - John Russell McCarthy, Nature Poems
1929 - Frank M. Chapman, Handbook of Birds of Eastern North America (published 1906)
1930 - Archibald Rutledge, Peace in the Heart
1931 - no award
1932 - Frederick S. Dellenbaugh, A Canyon Voyage: A Narrative of the Second Powell Expedition, 
1933 - Oliver P. Medsker, Spring, Summer, Fall, Winter (set)
1934 - W.W. Christman, Wild Pasture Pine
1935 - no award
1936 - Charles Crawford Gorst, Recordings of Bird Calls
1937 - no award
1938 - Robert Cushman Murphy, Oceanic Birds of South America
1939 - T. Gilbert Pearson, Adventures in Bird Protection
1940 - Arthur Cleveland Bent, Life Histories of North American Birds (18 title series, United States Government Printing Office)
1941 - Louis J. Halle, Jr., Birds Against Men
1942 - Edward A. Armstrong, Birds of the Grey Wind
1943 - Edwin Way Teale, Near Horizons: The Story of an Insect Garden
1944 - no award
1945 - Rutherford Platt, This Green World 
1946 - Florence Page Jaques and Francis Lee Jaques (illustrator), Snowshoe Country, 
1947 - no award
1948 - Theodora Stanwell-Fletcher, Driftwood Valley, 
1949 - Helen G. Cruickshank, Flight Into Sunshine: Bird Experiences in Florida
1950 - Roger Tory Peterson, Birds Over America, 
1951 - no award
1952 - Rachel Carson, The Sea Around Us, 
1953 - Gilbert Klingel, The Bay, 
1954 - Joseph Wood Krutch, The Desert Year, 
1955 - Wallace Byron Grange and Olaus J. Murie (illustrator), Those of the Forest, 
1956 - Guy Murchie, Song of the Sky
1957 - Archie Fairly Carr, The Windward Road: Adventures of a Naturalist on Remote Caribbean Shores, 
1958 - Robert Porter Allen, On the Trail of the Vanishing Birds
1959 - no award
1960 - John Kieran, A Natural History of New York City, 
1961 - Loren Eiseley, The Firmament of Time, 
1962 - George Miksch Sutton, Iceland Summer: Adventures of a Bird Painter, 
1963 - Adolph Murie, A Naturalist in Alaska, 
1964 - John Hay, The Great Beach: A Naturalist Explores the Frontier Between Land and Sea on the Outer Reaches of Cape Cod, 
1965 - Paul Brooks, Roadless Area, 
1966 - Louis Darling, The Gull's Way, 
1967 - Charlton Ogburn, Jr., The Winter Beach, 
1968 - Hal Borland, Hill Country Harvest
1969 - Louise de Kiriline Lawrence, The Lovely and the Wild, 
1970 - Victor B. Scheffer, The Year of the Whale
1971 - John K. Terres, From Laurel Hill to Siler's Bog, 
1972 - Robert S. Arbib, The Lord's Woods: The Passing of an American Woodland, 
1973 - Elizabeth Barlow, The Forests and Wetlands of New York City
1974 - Sigurd F. Olson, Wilderness Days, 
1975 - no award
1976 - Ann Haymond Zwinger, Run, River, Run, 
1977 - Aldo Leopold, A Sand County Almanac, 
1978 - Ruth Kirk, The American Southwest Desert, 
1979 - Barry Lopez, Of Wolves and Men, 
1980 - no award
1981 - Mary Durant and Michael Harwood, On the Road with John James Audubon, 
1982 - Peter Matthiessen, Sand Rivers, 
1983 - Alexander F. Skutch, A Naturalist on a Tropical Farm, 
1984 - David Rains Wallace, The Klamath Knot: Explorations of Myth and Evolution, 
1985 - Mark Owens and Delia Owens, Cry of the Kalahari, 
1986 - Gary Paul Nabhan, Gathering the Desert, 
1987 - Robert Michael Pyle, Wintergreen: Rambles in a Ravaged Land, 
1988 - Tom Horton and Charles R. Hazard (illustrator), Bay Country, 
1989 - Lawrence Kilham, On Watching Birds, 
1990 - John McPhee, The Control of Nature, 
1991 - Richard Nelson, The Island Within, 
1992 - Kenneth S. Norris, Dolphin Days: The Life and Times of the Spinner Dolphin, 
1993 - Vincent Dethier, Crickets and Katydids, Concerts and Solos, 
1994 - David G. Campbell, The Crystal Desert: Summers in Antarctica, 
1995 - Craig Packer, Into Africa, 
1996 - Bill Green, Water, Ice and Stone:Science and Memory on the Antarctic Lakes, 
1997 - David Quammen, The Song Of The Dodo: Island Biogeography in an Age of Extinction, 
1998 - John Alcock, In a Desert Garden:Love and Death Among the Insects, 
1999 - Jan DeBlieu, Wind: How the Flow of Air Has Shaped Life, Myth, and the Land, 
2000 - Bernd Heinrich, Mind Of the Raven, 
2001 - David M. Carroll, Swampwalker's Journal, 
2002 - Ken Lamberton, Wilderness and Razor Wire, 
2003 - Carl Safina, Eye of the Albatross: Visions of Hope and Survival, 
2004 - Ted Levin, Liquid Land: A Journey Through The Florida Everglades, 
2005 - Robin Wall Kimmerer, Gathering Moss: A Natural and Cultural History of Mosses, 
2006 - Donald Kroodsma, The Singing Life of Birds, 
2007 - Ellen Meloy, Eating Stone: Imagination And The Loss Of The Wild, 
2008 - Julia Whitty, The Fragile Edge: Diving and Other Adventures in the South Pacific, 
2009 - Franklin Burroughs, Confluence: Merrymeeting Bay, 
2010 - Michael Welland, Sand: The Never-Ending Story, 
2011 - Elisabeth Tova Bailey, The Sound of a Wild Snail Eating, 
2012 - Edward (Ted) Hoagland, Sex and the River Styx, 
2013 - Thor Hanson, Feathers: The Evolution of a Natural Miracle, 
2014 - Kathleen Jamie, Sightlines, 
2015 - Sherry Simpson, Dominion of Bears, 
2016 - Sharman Apt Russell, Diary of a Citizen Scientist,  
2017 - Brian Doyle, Martin Marten,  
2018 - David George Haskell, The Songs of Trees, ; a special John Burroughs Medal was given for Lifetime Achievement in Nature Poetry to Pattiann Rogers
2020 - Marilyn Sigman, Entangled: People and Ecological Change in Alaska's Kachemak Bay,

References

External links

 

American literary awards
Awards established in 1926

Science writing awards